Francisco Jiménez was a colonial Nahua noble from Tecamachalco. He served as judge-governor of Tenochtitlan for a year and five months in 1568 and 1569, and was the first outsider to govern Tenochtitlan.
Despite being a noble, the use of the honorific don with his name is inconsistent.

See also

List of Tenochtitlan rulers

Notes

References
 
 
 

|-

Nahua nobility
Governors of San Juan Tenochtitlan
16th-century indigenous people of the Americas
16th-century Mexican people
16th-century births
Year of birth missing
Year of death missing
People from Puebla

Nobility of the Americas